The Paleoarchean, also spelled Palaeoarchaean (formerly known as the early Archean), is a geologic era within the Archean Eon. The name derives from Greek "Palaios" ancient. It spans the period of time . The era is defined chronometrically and is not referenced to a specific level of a rock section on Earth. The earliest confirmed evidence of life comes from this era, and Vaalbara, one of Earth's earliest supercontinents, may have formed during this era.

Early life 

The geological record from the Paleoarchean era is very limited. Due to deformation and metamorphism, most rocks from the Paleoarchean era cannot provide any useful information. There are only two locations in the world containing rock formations that are intact enough to preserve evidence of early life: the Kaapvaal Craton in Southern Africa and the Pilbara Craton in Western Australia.

The Dresser Formation is located in the Pilbara Craton, and contains sedimentary rock from the Paleoarchean Era. It is estimated to be 3.48 billion years old. The Dresser Formation includes a great variety of structures caused by ancient life including stromatolites and MISS once formed by microbial mats. Such microbial mats belong to the oldest ascertained life form and may include fossilized bacteria.
The Strelley Pool Chert, also located in the Pilbara Craton, contains stromatolites that may have been created by bacteria 3.4 billion years ago. However, it is possible that these stromatolies are abiogenic and were actually formed through evaporitic precipitation then deposited on the sea floor.

The Barberton Greenstone Belt, located in the Kaapvaal Craton, also contains evidence of life. The Buck Reef chert and the Josefsdal chert, two rock formations in the Barberton Greenstone Belt, both contain microbial mats with fossilized bacteria from the Paleoarchean era. The Kromberg Formation, near the top of the Onverwacht Group which itself is a part of the Barberton Greenstone Belt, dates back to approximately 3.416–3.334 Ga and contains evidence of microbial life reproducing via multiple fission and binary fission.

Continental development 

Similarities between the Barberton Greenstone Belt in the Kaapvaal Craton and the eastern part of the Pilbara Craton indicate that the two formations were once joined as part of the supercontinent Vaalbara, one of Earth's earliest supercontinents. Both cratons formed at the beginning of the Paleoarchean era. While some paleomagnetic data suggests that they were connected during the Paleoarchean era, it is possible that Vaalbara did not form until the Mesoarchean or Neoarchean eras.

It is also unclear whether there was any exposed land during the Paleoarchean era. Although several Paleoarchean formations such as the Dresser Formation, the Josefsdal Chert, and the Mendon Formation show some evidence of being above the surface, over 90 percent of Archean continental crust has been destroyed, making the existence of exposed land practically impossible to confirm or deny. It is likely that during the Paleoarchean era, there was a large amount of continental crust, but it was still underwater and would not emerge until later in the Archean era. Hotspot islands may have been the only exposed land at the time.

Due to a much hotter mantle and an elevated oceanic geothermal gradient compared to the present day, plate tectonics in its modern form did not exist during the Paleoarchean. Instead, a model of "flake tectonics" has been proposed for this era of geologic time. According to this model, instead of normal subduction of oceanic plates, extensively silicified upper oceanic crust delaminated from lower oceanic crust and was deposited in a manner similar to ophiolites from the later Proterozoic and Phanerozoic eons.

References

External links

 Paleoarchean (chronostratigraphy scale)

02
Geological eras
Precambrian geochronology